Major-General Sir Peter Bernard Gillett,  (8 December 1913 – 4 July 1989) was a British Army officer.

Military career
Gillett was commissioned into the Royal Artillery on 1 February 1934. After serving in the rank of captain in the Second World War, he became Commander, Royal Artillery for 3rd Infantry Division in December 1959, Chief of Staff at Eastern Command in December 1962 and General Officer Commanding 48th (South Midland) Division/District of the Territorial Army in April 1965. His last appointment was as General Officer Commanding West Midlands District in April 1967 before retiring in April 1968.

In retirement he served as Secretary of the Central Chancery of the Orders of Knighthood from 1968 to 1979 and then as Deputy Constable and Lieutenant-Governor of Windsor Castle from 1978 to 1989.

References

1913 births
1989 deaths
British Army major generals
Knights Commander of the Royal Victorian Order
Companions of the Order of the Bath
Commanders of the Order of the British Empire
Royal Artillery officers
British Army personnel of World War II